Tieling County is a county in the northeast of Liaoning province, China. It is the southernmost county-level division of the prefecture-level city of Tieling.

Administrative divisions
There are eight towns and seven townships under the county's administration.

Towns:
Aji, Zhenxibao, Xintaizi, Yaobao, Fanhe, Pingdingbao, Dadianzi

Townships:
Cainiu Township, Shuangjingzi Township, Xiongguantun Township, Liqianhu Township, Jiguanshan Township, Hengdaohezi Manchu Ethnic Township, Baiqizhai Manchu Ethnic Township

References

County-level divisions of Liaoning
Tieling